Faking It is a television programme originating on Channel 4 which has spawned various international remakes, including a United States version which began in 2003 on the TLC network. Devised by Stephen Lambert of RDF Media, the programme's original concept was "a modern-day Pygmalion", referring to the George Bernard Shaw play in which flower girl Eliza Doolittle is trained to appear like an aristocrat.

History
The programme debuted in 2000 with a run of only two episodes, one of which featured Alex Geikie, a well-spoken gay man, being taught to "fake it" as a London club bouncer. The second episode was a straight use of the Pygmalion concept as a young working-class woman, Lisa Dickinson-Grey, was taught how to behave in high society by Tim Walker, The Daily Telegraph's Mandrake diarist. Since the show began being sold abroad, these episodes have picked up the titles "Alex The Animal" and "Lady Lisa". The series ended on Boxing Day 2006 with faker Sharon Pallister transforming from cleaner to burlesque performer and featured Wayne Sleep, Miss Immodesty Blaize and Dita von Teese.

The first two episodes were well received by critics and a further seven episodes followed in 2001, ten in 2002, five in 2003, thirteen in 2004, three T4 specials, and a final feature-length show in 2005. The programme had always fared well in the ratings, with an average audience of just over two million a strong showing for Channel 4.

Format
The programme shared much with earlier British TV shows such as In At The Deep End and Jobs For The Boys/Girls, and more recently the children's show Bring It On, all of which featured TV presenters or other celebrities learning other trades, but Faking It was the first that successfully used members of the public in the role. Its basic format was that a member of the public lived with and trained with an expert for four weeks and then took part in a contest against experienced participants in whatever activity they have learned. A panel of expert judges then gave their verdict on which participant was the "faker". Ostensibly, success meant fooling a majority of the judges, though there was no prize for success and the real point of the show was the experience that the fakers received over the course of the month's filming.

Success and controversy
Among the most acclaimed episodes were cellist Sian Evans learning to be a club DJ, burger-van proprietor Ed Devlin training with Gordon Ramsay to become a cordon bleu chef, former naval petty officer being trained as a drag artist and city lawyer George LuBega learning the art of the garage MC.

In 2003, participant Laura-Jane Foley claimed she had been misrepresented by the show. A former choirgirl, she had taken part in an episode in which she was taught how to be the front woman for a punk rock band. The episode in question had run into trouble before it even aired, with regular sponsors Smirnoff refusing to be associated with its scenes of "irresponsible drinking", but apart from an article in the Cambridge university newspaper Varsity, Foley did not pursue the matter further. She is, however, the only participant to date not to co-operate with Channel 4 in pre- and post-publicity for the show.

The show has proven hugely successful in the UK and elsewhere, twice winning the BAFTA award for Best Factual Feature. A 2002 episode in which punk singer Chris Sweeney was trained as an orchestral conductor won the Golden Rose of Montreux in 2003 as well as the Press Prize at the same festival.  The chef episode won an International Emmy Award.

References

External links
 

2000s British reality television series
2000 British television series debuts
2006 British television series endings
Channel 4 original programming
Channel 4 reality television shows
Television series by Banijay